This is a master list pertaining to lists of endemic birds.  As applied to birds, the term "endemic" refers to any species found only within a defined geographical area. There is no upper limit for the area; it would not be incorrect to refer to all bird species as endemic to Earth.  In practice, the largest areas for which the term is in common use are countries and geographical regions.  An Endemic Bird Area (EBA), a term devised by BirdLife International, is a geographical (rather than political) region of the world that contains two or more restricted-range (of no more than 50,000 km2) species, while a "secondary area" contains one restricted-range species.

Endemic birds
Palearctic
Endemic birds of the Western Palearctic
Endemic birds of Central Asia
Endemic birds of Japan

Afrotropical
 Endemic birds of eastern Africa
 Endemic birds of western and central Africa
 Endemic birds of southern Africa
 Endemic birds of Madagascar and western Indian Ocean islands

Indomalayan
 Endemic birds of the Indian Subcontinent
 Endemic birds of the Andaman and Nicobar Islands
 Endemic birds of the Himalayas
 Endemic birds of Southeast Asia
 Endemic birds of Peninsular Malaysia, Sumatra, Java & Bali
 Endemic birds of Borneo
 Endemic birds of Sulawesi
 Endemic birds of the Philippines
 Endemic birds of Taiwan
Endemic birds of Sri Lanka

Australasia
 Endemic birds of Australia
 Endemic birds of New Guinea and neighbouring islands
 Endemic birds of New Zealand
 Endemic birds of New Caledonia

Oceania
 Endemic birds of Hawaii

Nearctic
 Endemic birds of eastern North America
 Endemic birds of western North America
 Endemic birds of the West Indies
 Endemic birds of Mexico and northern Central America

Neotropical
 Endemic birds of southern Central America
 Endemic birds of the Galápagos Islands
 Endemic birds of northern South America
 Endemic birds of southern Atlantic islands
 Endemic birds of Colombia

Endemic bird areas
 List of endemic bird areas of the world
 List of secondary endemic bird areas of the world

See also
 Endemic Bird Area
 Important Bird Area

References 

 Putting biodiversity on the map: priority areas for global conservation C. J. Bibby, N. J. Collar, M. J. Crosby, M.F. Heath, Ch. Imboden, T. H. Johnson, A. J. Long, A. J. Stattersfield and S. J. Thirgood (1992) 
 Endemic Bird Areas of the World: Priorities for Biodiversity Conservation Alison J. Stattersfield, Michael J. Crosby, Adrian J. Long and David C. Wege (1998) 

Endemism